Tutti Frutti is a BBC Scotland six-part drama series, transmitted in 1987 and written by John Byrne. It starred Robbie Coltrane, Emma Thompson, Maurice Roëves, Richard Wilson and Katy Murphy. It won six BAFTAs and brought many of the cast to national prominence.

Plot
The Majestics, a legendary Scots rock 'n' roll band, are on the eve of their 1986 "Silver Jubilee" tour, and find themselves in trouble when their lead singer, Big Jazza McGlone (Coltrane), is killed in a car crash.

The group's devious and exploitative manager Eddie Clockerty (Wilson) talks Big Jazza's younger brother, Danny (also Coltrane), home from New York for the funeral, into joining the band as their new lead singer. Suzi Kettles (Thompson), a sharp cookie and old classmate of Danny, picks up the guitar and also joins the band. From that moment, the ill-fated tour and the band's fortunes appear to take a turn for the better.

The Majestics' final dispiriting tour of Scotland's less salubrious clubs and pubs is punctuated by childish backstage squabbling and a series of personal disasters. Ageing heart-throb Vincent Diver (Roëves), 'the iron man of Scottish Rock', is cheating on his wife Noreen (a community nurse and sister of drummer Bomba) with girlfriend Glenna (played by Fiona Chalmers as simultaneously pathetic, manipulative and glutinously cloying), who has an apparent pregnancy and when the unborn child dies (or maybe never existed from the start), she commits suicide by jumping from a bridge into the Clyde.

Vincent is also knifed in Buckie by a girl who believes she is his illegitimate daughter from a one-night stand on a tour of long ago. Suzi Kettles proves to have an abusive estranged husband, a dentist, in whose teeth Danny drills holes with the dentist's drill for his battering of Suzi. The fractious on-off relationship between rotund Danny McGlone and Suzi adds a further comic dimension, along with the 'double-act' of the dour Mr Clockerty and his lippy secretary Janice Toner (Murphy). In the final sequence, during the Majestics' grand finale concert at Glasgow Pavilion, Vincent douses himself in Polish vodka and sets himself alight.

Re-release
Although it attained 'cult' status, it was only repeated once on BBC Two, albeit only 10 months after its first transmission on BBC One, and was not available on video or DVD. Various rumours circulated for many years as to why, but the BBC never confirmed the reasons. However, in March 2007 John Byrne explained that the problem had been due to a performance of the song "Tutti Frutti" in one episode (not the title sequence) where Danny McGlone changes the lyrics to "here's the rub, she makes me sleep in a tub".  This is a reference to an earlier scene where Kettles is coerced into letting McGlone stay at her flat, but insists he sleeps in the bathtub.   As a result of this change the BBC's usual music licensing did not apply, and the copyright holder Little Richard requested a prohibitively high fee.

In 2006 a BBC spokesperson stated that these issues were 'resolvable', allowing for a DVD release or BBC Four transmission. John Byrne said he thought the original film stock (including out-takes) may have been destroyed, and that only the broadcast masters may survive.

The BBC released a two-disc Region 2 DVD package of the series on 3 August 2009 in the UK.

In March 2019, BBC Scotland re-broadcast the six original episodes - directly after a documentary about the making of both the series and the stage play, called : The Return of The Majestics. 

It was broadcast again over three consecutive nights, starting on Boxing Day 2022 (the year of Coltrane's death) on BBC Four, preceded by a short programme in which Richard Wilson recalled his memory of the production. Tutti Fruiti was made available on BBC iPlayer in early 2023.

Stage play
In 2006 Byrne reworked the series into a stage play, produced as a co-production between the National Theatre of Scotland and His Majesty's Theatre in Aberdeen, where it opened on 22 September 2006. In 2007 the show toured to the King's Theatre, Glasgow, the King's Theatre, Edinburgh and the Grand Theatre, Blackpool.

Cast
 Robbie Coltrane as Danny McGlone / Big Jazza
 Emma Thompson as Suzi Kettles
 Richard Wilson as Eddie Clockerty
 Katy Murphy as Janice Toner
 Maurice Roëves as Vincent Diver
 Stuart McGugan as Bomba MacAteer
 Jake D'Arcy as Francis 'Fud' O'Donnell
 Ron Donachie as Dennis Sproul
 Fiona Chalmers as Glenna McFadden

Episodes

Awards
The series won six BAFTAs in 1988.

 Best Actress – Emma Thompson
 Best Drama Series – Andy Park, Tony Smith
 Best Graphics – Sandi Anderson, John Byrne
 Best Make Up – Lorna Blair
 Best Sound Supervisor – Brian Dewar
 Best VTR Editor – Peter Hayes

References

External links

Tutti Frutti review on Screenonline

1987 in Scotland
BBC Scotland television shows
BAFTA winners (television series)
BBC comedy-drama television shows
Scottish television comedy
1987 Scottish television series debuts
1987 Scottish television series endings
1980s Scottish television series
Television shows set in Scotland
1980s British comedy-drama television series
1980s British television miniseries